David Elliot Salzman (born December 1, 1943) is an American television producer and businessman. Salzman has been involved in a number of industries that include television news and entertainment, feature films, live theater, sports, and musical events.

Early life
Salzman was raised in Brooklyn, New York. He earned his college degree from Brooklyn College, during which he had a stint at The New York Times. He was accepted into the Columbia University Graduate School of Journalism. After speaking with numerous journalists, he was dissuaded from attending Columbia due to "the declining nature of the business". He decided to attend the Mass communications program at Wayne State University.

Career

The Lou Gordon Show
Salzman's career in the entertainment industry started during his years at Wayne State when he was a producer on the popular Detroit television talk program, The Lou Gordon Show, on Channel 50. Salzman wrote, produced, booked guests, and even did makeup; the show attracted many big celebrities. An interview with Michigan Governor George Romney inadvertently ended Romney's presidential campaign in 1968.

KDKA (first stint)
After, Salzman joined Group W, Westinghouse's family of television stations, and moved up the ranks beginning with the CBS affiliate KDKA in Pittsburgh as news director from 1970 to 1972.

KYW
Later in 1972, Salzman moved to Philadelphia, where he became the station manager at KYW. During his time as station manager, he was an executive producer on The Mike Douglas Show.

KDKA (second stint)
In 1974, he moved back to Pittsburgh to become the general manager of KDKA until 1975.

Group W Productions
Salzman was elevated to Group W Productions headquarters in New York City and was named chairman of the board. He launched the syndicated strip programs Everyday and The Peter Marshall Show while running Group W.

NIWS
He moved to Los Angeles in 1978 and left Group W to create NIWS (News Informational Weekly Service), a nationally syndicated news service. NIWS ran in over 200 domestic markets, providing pre-packaged human interest news stories that subscriber stations could incorporate into their local broadcasts. Salzman quickly became a pioneer in the news industry.

Telepictures
Salzman joined the nascent company Telepictures as a partner with Michael Garin and Michael Solomon. At Telepictures, they acquired syndicated television rights to older programs such as My Favorite Martian, Here's Lucy, and the Rankin-Bass library of stop-motion animated television specials, and would sell them both domestically and internationally. Telepictures quickly moved into original production with syndicated mainstays Love Connection, and the original The People's Court with Judge Joseph Wapner. Television movies and miniseries production followed, with notable productions such as Murder in Texas and World War III.

Lorimar-Telepictures
In 1985, Salzman and Telepictures acquired Lorimar. With Lorimar-Telepictures, Salzman assumed the office of the president and ran the first-run and syndication television production units. Including existing hit drama shows that Lorimar had already created (Dallas, Knots Landing, and Falcon Crest), Lorimar-Telepictures remained relevant in the industry by going on to produce new situation comedies such as Full House, The Hogan Family, ALF, and Perfect Strangers. These series were produced at the Lorimar-Telepictures Studios (formerly MGM Studios), which is now Sony Pictures Entertainment.

Warner Bros. buyout
In 1989, Lorimar-Telepictures was acquired by Warner Bros. Salzman became President of Warner Bros. Television, where he also oversaw sales and marketing operations for television cable and satellite companies outside of the U.S. Warner Bros. expanded international telecommunications interests. In 1990, he left Lorimar Television to start Millennium Productions, which was eventually renamed to David Salzman Entertainment, pooling the resources of affiliated production houses Lorimar Television and Telepictures Productions. Under his watch, he produced The Jenny Jones Show, and the CBS show Dark Justice.

Quincy Jones-David Salzman Entertainment
Still under the Warner banner, Salzman co-founded Quincy Jones-David Salzman Entertainment with Quincy Jones, which produced well-known shows such as Fresh Prince of Bel-Air, Their Eyes Were Watching God, and In the House. In 1995, Salzman and Jones produced the 1996 Academy Awards. In 1996, Salzman was an Executive Producer on the Academy Award-nominated short-film Brooms. In the following year, Salzman produced the movie Steel starring NBA legend Shaquille O'Neal. Salzman has produced more than 15,000 hours of television, including fifteen seasons of MADtv. In addition, Salzman has been nominated for two Primetime Emmy Awards, one Daytime Emmy, and two Writers Guild of America Awards. Salzman also produced the 1993 Clinton Presidential Inauguration event at the Lincoln Memorial with Jones, along with the Concert of the Americas. With Jones, Salzman also co-owned Vibe and Spin Magazine. In 1997, both Jones and Salzman part ways, with Salzman starting David Salzman Enterprises on its own. On March 1, 2000, he joined Enigma Digital as a member of the board of directors.

Television stations
In a return to his roots, Salzman has co-owned several television stations. Early on in his career, Salzman sold a license for a WB station in Syracuse. Soon after, Salzman founded and owned KCWE in Kansas City and co-founded and co-owned WBWB in Louisville. He also oversaw the station group for the minority-run QWEST Broadcasting Stations with partners Sonia Salzman, Geraldo Rivera, Willie Davis, Don Cornelius, and Tribune Media. In addition to this, he also owned WATL in Atlanta, KMID in Midland, WSPR in Springfield, and WNOL in New Orleans, which he eventually sold the license to News Corp.

AMGEN Tour of California
In 2006, Salzman co-founded the AMGEN Tour of California. The Tour of California is the only event on the top-level World Tour in the United States and is America's largest professional cycling event.

Filmography

References

1943 births
Living people
Brooklyn College alumni